Andre Keith Braugher (born July 1, 1962) is an American actor. He is best known for his roles as Detective Frank Pembleton in the police drama series Homicide: Life on the Street (1993–1999), used car salesman Owen Thoreau Jr. in the comedy-drama series Men of a Certain Age (2009–2011), and Captain Raymond Holt in the police comedy series Brooklyn Nine-Nine (2013–2021).

For his television work, Braugher has received two Primetime Emmy Awards from 11 nominations, as well as two Golden Globe Award nominations. He has also had supporting roles in films such as Glory (1989), Primal Fear (1996), City of Angels (1998), Frequency (2000), Poseidon (2006), The Mist (2007), Fantastic Four: Rise of the Silver Surfer (2007), Salt (2010), and The Gambler (2014), in addition to appearing in series such as BoJack Horseman, House, and New Girl.

Early life
Andre Keith Braugher was born in Chicago on July 1, 1962, the youngest of four children born to Sally, a postal worker, and Floyd Braugher, a heavy equipment operator. He attended St. Ignatius College Prep and graduated from Stanford University with a BA in theatre in 1984. He then attended the Juilliard School's Drama Division, graduating in 1988.

Career
Braugher's first film role was in the 1989 film Glory as Thomas Searles, a free, educated black man from the North who joins the first black regiment in the Union Army. He played Kojak's sidekick in the late-1980s ABC television film revival of Kojak. He subsequently moved on to a role on the television series Homicide: Life on the Street as Detective Frank Pembleton, a self-righteous, fiery, unyielding, Jesuit-educated police detective. Braugher won Television Critics Association awards for individual achievement in drama in 1997 and 1998. He was nominated for a Primetime Emmy Award for Outstanding Lead Actor in a Drama Series in 1996 and 1998, winning in the latter year. He left Homicide after its sixth season but returned for the reunion television film. He has also co-starred in the films City of Angels, Frequency, and Poseidon.

In 1997, he was selected by People as one of the "50 Most Beautiful People in the World".

As part of the Shakespeare in the Park series at the Delacorte Theater in New York City's Central Park, Braugher played the title role in the 1996 production of Henry V, for which he received an Obie Award. In 2000, he played the title role as Ben Gideon in the series Gideon's Crossing, which lasted one season. In 2002, Braugher narrated the award-winning, PBS-broadcast documentary Muhammad: Legacy of a Prophet, produced by Unity Productions Foundation and recently re-issued. He narrated The Murder of Emmett Till for PBS. He played Detective Marcellus Washington in the TV series Hack from 2002 to 2004. In 2006, Braugher starred as Nick Atwater in the mini-series Thief for FX Networks, winning a second Emmy for his performance. He portrayed General Hager in the 2007 film Fantastic Four: Rise of the Silver Surfer.

Braugher appeared on the TV series House, M.D. as Dr. Darryl Nolan, a psychiatrist who helps House recover from his addiction to Vicodin. He also appeared in the TNT series Men of a Certain Age, for which he was nominated twice as Primetime Emmy Award for Outstanding Supporting Actor in a Drama Series. He also voiced the villain Darkseid in the animated film, Superman/Batman: Apocalypse.

Braugher co-starred in the Manhattan Theatre Club's production of The Whipping Man, off-Broadway, for a limited run from January–March 2011. He narrated the introduction to the Olympic Games on NBC from 2006 to 2010, succeeding James Earl Jones in the role. Braugher narrated James Patterson's Alex Cross book Cross Fire (2010).

He has a recurring role as defense attorney Bayard Ellis on Law & Order: Special Victims Unit, and starred as the lead character, Capt. Marcus Chaplin, in ABC's military drama TV series Last Resort. Braugher also had a recurring role in season 4 of the Netflix animated series BoJack Horseman as California Gov. Woodchuck Coodchuck-Berkowitz. He starred in the Golden Globe-winning TV series Brooklyn Nine-Nine as the precinct captain, Raymond Holt. For his performance in Brooklyn Nine Nine, he has been nominated for four Primetime Emmy Awards for Outstanding Supporting Actor in a Comedy Series.

Personal life
In 1991, Braugher married actress Ami Brabson, who co-starred with him in Homicide: Life on the Street. They have three children.

Filmography

Film

Television

Awards and nominations

References

External links
 
 
 

1962 births
Living people
20th-century American male actors
20th-century Unitarians
21st-century American male actors
21st-century Unitarians
African-American male actors
American male film actors
American male television actors
American male voice actors
American Unitarian Universalists
Juilliard School alumni
Male actors from Chicago
Male actors from New Jersey
Outstanding Performance by a Lead Actor in a Drama Series Primetime Emmy Award winners
Outstanding Performance by a Lead Actor in a Miniseries or Movie Primetime Emmy Award winners
People from South Orange, New Jersey
St. Ignatius College Prep alumni
Stanford University alumni
20th-century African-American people
21st-century African-American people